Frank I. Cacciatore (born April 25, 1955 in Tampa, Florida) is currently a minor league baseball coach in the Philadelphia Phillies organization. He is a former minor league baseball player and manager and a former college baseball coach.

Playing career
Cacciatore played in the Detroit Tigers organization in 1975 and 1976. For the Lakeland Tigers in 1975, he hit .223 in 72 games. In nine games for the Montgomery Rebels in 1976, he hit .200. Overall, he batted .220 in 81 minor league games.

Post-playing career
After his minor league playing career ended, Cacciatore coached baseball at the college level for many years. In 1986, he managed the Hyannis Mets, a collegiate summer baseball team in the prestigious Cape Cod Baseball League.

Cacciatore's first minor league managerial job came in 1988, when he was a last-minute replacement as manager of the Auburn Astros of the short-season Class A New York–Penn League. (Jim Coveney had been named manager of the Auburn Astros for 1988 but replaced Gary Tuck as manager of the Asheville Tourists in mid-season, before he had managed a single game for Auburn.) In Auburn, Cacciatore was the first professional manager of future Major League Baseball stars Luis Gonzalez and Kenny Lofton, both of whom were selected by the Houston Astros in the 1988 draft and assigned to Auburn to begin their professional baseball careers.

As of 2012, Cacciatore has managed seven different teams at the short-season Class A, full-season Class A, and Double-A levels of Minor League Baseball. Cacciatore has also coached in the Houston Astros, San Francisco Giants, Florida Marlins, Montreal Expos/Washington Nationals, and New York Mets systems. He is currently the hitting coach for the Reading Fightin Phils.

Year-by-year Minor League managerial record

References

External links

1955 births
Living people
Baseball coaches from Florida
Cape Cod Baseball League coaches
Asheville Tourists managers
Baseball players from Tampa, Florida
Lakeland Tigers players
Montgomery Rebels players
Portland Sea Dogs managers